Peter Keller (born 22 June 1961) is a German former footballer.

References

External links

1961 births
Living people
German footballers
East German footballers
FSV Zwickau players
Chemnitzer FC players
German football managers
2. Bundesliga players
DDR-Oberliga players
Association football defenders
FSV Zwickau managers
People from Zwickau
Footballers from Saxony
20th-century German people